The Philips Pavilion was a World's Fair pavilion designed for Expo '58 in Brussels by the office of Le Corbusier. Commissioned by electronics manufacturer Philips, the pavilion was designed to house a multimedia spectacle that celebrated postwar technological progress. Because Le Corbusier was busy with the planning of Chandigarh, much of the project management was assigned to Iannis Xenakis, who was also an experimental composer and was influenced in the design by his composition Metastaseis.

The reinforced concrete pavilion is a cluster of nine hyperbolic paraboloids in which music, Edgard Varèse's Poème électronique, was spatialized by sound projectionists using telephone dials. The speakers were set into the walls, which were coated in asbestos, creating a textured look to the walls. Varèse drew up a detailed spatialization scheme for the entire piece which made great use of the physical layout of the pavilion, especially the height of it. The asbestos hardened the walls which created a cavernous acoustic. As audiences entered and exited the building Xenakis's musique concrète composition Concret PH was heard. The building was demolished on 30 January 1959.

The European Union funded a virtual recreation of the Philips Pavilion, which was chaired by Vincenzo Lombardi from the University of Turin.

Arseniusz Romanowicz's Warszawa Ochota train station in Poland is supposedly inspired by the Philips Pavilion.

Construction

References

Further reading 
 Marc Treib, Space Calculated in Seconds: The Philips Pavilion, Le Corbusier, Edgard Varèse, Princeton: Princeton Architectural Press, 1996
 James Harley, Xenakis: his life in music, London: Taylor & Francis Books, 2004
 Richard Jarvis, Music to my Eyes:  The design of the Philips Pavilion by Ianis Xenakis, Boston: Boston Architectural Center, 2002
 "The Architectural Design of Le Corbusier and Xenakis" in Philips Technical Review v. 20 n. 1 (1958/1959)
 Joe Drew, "Recreating the Philips Pavilion", ANABlog. January 16, 2010.
 Jan de Heer and Kees Tazelaar, From Harmony to Chaos: Le Corbusier, Varèse, Xenakis and Le poème électronique, Amsterdam: 1001 Publishers, 2017

External links 
 Film De Bouw van het Philips Paviljoen (Building the Philips Pavilion), a Dutch documentary about the construction project.
 Virtual Electronic Poem Project, a site about a virtual reconstruction of the Philips Pavilion with extensive information about the original site.

Le Corbusier buildings
Expo 58
1958 in Belgium
Spatial music
Philips
World's fair architecture in Belgium
Buildings and structures in Brussels
Hyperboloid structures